is a city located in Gunma Prefecture, Japan. , the city had an estimated population of 50,266 in 21,028 households, and a population density of 240 persons per km².

Geography
Midori is located in eastern Gunma Prefecture in the northern Kantō Plains. The city is shaped like an inverse triangle, bordered by Tochigi Prefecture to the north, and by the city of Kiryū to the east and west. The Watarase River runs through parts of Midori City.

Surrounding municipalities
Gunma Prefecture
 Kiryū
 Isesaki
 Ōta
 Numata
Tochigi Prefecture
 Sano
 Kanuma
 Nikkō

Climate
Midori has a Humid continental climate (Köppen Cfa) characterized by warm summers and cold winters with heavy snowfall.  The average annual temperature in Midori is 14.0 °C. The average annual rainfall is 1296 mm with September as the wettest month. The temperatures are highest on average in August, at around 26.3 °C, and lowest in January, at around 2.7 °C.

Demographics
Per Japanese census data, the population of Midori has recently plateaued after a long period of growth.

History
The city of Midori was established on March 27, 2006, from the merger of the town of Ōmama (from Yamada District), the town of Kasakake (from Nitta District), and the village of Azuma (from Seta District). All three districts were dissolved as a result of this merger.

Government
Midori has a mayor-council form of government with a directly elected mayor and a unicameral city council of 18 members. Midori contributes one member to the Gunma Prefectural Assembly. In terms of national politics, the city is part of Gunma 1st district of the lower house of the Diet of Japan.

Economy
Midori is noted for its production of tomatoes and eggplants.

Education
Midori has seven public elementary schools and five public middle schools operated by the city government, and one public high schools operated by the Gunma Prefectural Board of Education. The prefecture also operates one special education school for the handicapped. Kiryu University and its associated junior college are located in Midori.

Elementary schools
Kasakake Elementary School
Kasakake Higashi Elementary School
Kasakake Kita Elementary School
Omama Higashi Elementary School
Omama Minami Elementary School
Omama Kita Elementary School
Azuma Elementary School
Middle schools
Kasakake Middle School
Kasakake Minami Middle School
Omama Middle School
Omama Higashi Middle School
Azuma Middle School
High schools
Omama High School
Universities
Kiryu University

Transportation

Railway
 JR East – Ryōmō Line
  
Watarase Keikoku Railway – Watarase Keikoku Line
  –  – ( – ) –  –  –  –  – 
 Jōmō Electric Railway Company - Jōmō Line
  
 Tōbu Railway – Tōbu Kiryū Line
  – ( – ) –

Highway

Local attractions

Iwajuku, National Historic Site
Tomihiro Art Museum

Noted people
Yui Ogura, voice actress, singer

References

External links

Official Website 

Cities in Gunma Prefecture
Midori, Gunma